Sid Ali Kouiret (3 January 1933 – 5 April 2015) was an Algerian actor.

Biography 
Kouiret was born at Algiers. He was a theater and cinema comedian. He had a difficult childhood. His father was a taxi driver, coming frequently drunk at home and was violent with his mother. On day, the little Sid Ali Kouiret, overwrought, gave a knife stab in the back of his father and was obliged to live on the streets at very young age. At 17, he was a procurer in the port of Algiers and had no connection with art. But he loved sport, especially swimming. And to do that, he had to cross "La Rue de la Marine" street. One day, he met there (at "Le Café de Daniel") Mustapha Kateb who directed in the fifties an amateur theatrical troupe. Since then, he started his adventure on the stages.

In 1951, he went to Berlin with "El Mesrah El Djazairi" theatrical troupe. And in 1952, they were in Paris; singing patriotic texts in Algerian coffees. In 1953, he went to Bucharest for 4th World Festival of Youth and Students for peace. And later the same year, he became a professional actor and engaged in the municipal troupe of Algiers, led by Mahieddine Bachtarzi. But in 1955, and because of the harassment and the persecution of the DST (French domestic intelligence agency), and for his safety, he was obliged to go away. So he went to Marseille, then to Paris where he met Mohamed Boudia, Hadj Omar, Missoum, and Noureddine Bouhired…

In 1958, he was a member of the theatrical troupe affiliated to the FLN (National Liberation Front) that was trying to make Algeria famous worldwide and to promote the Algerian struggle for freedom.

After the independence of Algeria, he was among the elements that will constitute the Algerian National Theatre. And in 1963 was the beginning of a brilliant cinematographic career. His first apparition in a film was on a TV adaptation of the play "Les Enfants de la Casbah" by Mustapha Badie (1963). But his real consecration was in "L’Opium et le Bâton" (1970) directed by Ahmed Rachedi. Then came "Décembre"(1971) and many other Algerian and foreign films like "Le Retour de L’Enfant Prodigue", directed by Youssef Chahine in 1976; and "Destins Sanglants" directed by Kheiri Bichara in 1980…

He died on 5 April 2015 in Algiers.

Filmography 
 1971 : L'Opium et le Bâton  - Directed by Ahmed Rachedi
 1971 : Décembre - Directed by Mohammed Lakhdar-Hamina
 1974 : L'Évasion de Hassan Terro - Directed by Mustapha Badie
 1975 : Chronique des années de braise - Directed by Mohammed Lakhdar-Hamina
 1976 : Le Retour de l'enfant prodigue - Directed by Youssef Chahine
 1977 : Les Ambassadeurs Directed by Naceur Ktari
 1983 : Les Sacrifiés - Directed by Okacha Touita
 1991 : Les Enfants Du Soleil
 2004 : Les Suspects  - Directed by Kamal Dehane
 2007 : Morituri - Directed by Okacha Touita
Television
 1963 : Les Enfants de la casbah - Directed by Abdelhalim Raïs
 1991 : La famille Ramdam - Directed by Ross Elavy
 2009 : Bâtiment d'El-Hadj Lakhdar 3 (Imarat El-Hadj Lakhdar 3) - Directed by Mahmoud Zemmour

References

External links 

1933 births
2015 deaths
Algerian male film actors
Algerian male stage actors
Algerian male television actors
20th-century Algerian male actors
21st-century Algerian male actors
People from Algiers